Tae Yong-ho (born 25 July 1962), also known by his pseudonym Tae Ku-min, is a North Korean-born South Korean politician and former diplomat who is serving as a member of the National Assembly for the Gangnam district of Seoul. He was North Korea's deputy ambassador to the United Kingdom, prior to defecting with his family to South Korea in 2016. In August 2016, the South Korean government confirmed that Thae and his family were under their protection. 

Tae was elected to the National Assembly in the 2020 South Korean legislative election as a member of the People Power Party.

Biography

Pre-defection
Tae studied abroad in Beijing, China at a young age, and learned English. He studied at Beijing Foreign Studies University. After coming back to North Korea, he went on to study at the Pyongyang University of Foreign Studies. Thae began working in the 1980s.

Tae is married to O Hye-son, a relative of Kim Il-sung's comrade in arms during the 1930s, O Paek-ryong. They have two sons. Their older son is a graduate of a British university, and their younger son, who was born in Denmark, when Thae was serving as a diplomat there, was studying at a London school. The younger son had recently been offered a place to study computer science at Imperial College London. However, the family had been recalled to Pyongyang just before Thae's defection. Thae was able to escape with his wife and children, but his brother and sister were left behind in North Korea. Thae stated after his defection that "I'm sure that my relatives and my brothers and sisters are either sent to remote, closed areas or to prison camps, and that really breaks my heart."

According to BBC reports, Thae is convivial, and enjoys Indian food, playing golf and tennis. In addition to Korean and English, he speaks fluent Mandarin. In 2015, he escorted Kim Jong-chul, the older brother of  North Korean Supreme Leader  Kim Jong-un, to an Eric Clapton concert in London. During his time in London, he lived in a two-bedroom flat in West London. Thae stated that he defected as he did not want his children who were used to a life of freedom in Britain to live a life of oppression in North Korea.

Thae was one of North Korea's elite, regarded by observers as a sophisticated diplomat who was one of the "best and brightest" in the country. Following Thae's defection, the North Korean government denounced  him as "human scum," accused him without evidence of crimes including embezzlement and child rape, and unsuccessfully petitioned Britain to extradite him to North Korea for trial.

Life after defection
Since his defection, Thae has given many talks and interviews about North Korea's secretive, authoritarian, and violent government. Citing the killings of Kim Jong-nam and Jang Song-thaek, Thae believes that he is likely a target for assassination by Kim Jong-un due to his defection and outspokenness. In an interview in January 2017, Thae stated that the United Nations sanctions on North Korea were hurting the Kim regime, and that it is under significant pressure. In another interview the same month, Thae said, "I am very determined to do everything possible to pull down the regime to save not only my family members but also the whole North Korean people from slavery." Thae believes that "Kim Jong-un's regime one day will collapse by a people's uprising." In an interview in April 2017, Thae stated that Kim was "desperate in maintaining his rule" and was relying heavily on its development of nuclear weapons and ballistic missiles to deter an external attack and preserve his grip on power.

Thae worked as an adviser at the Institute for National Security Strategy since early 2017, an organization affiliated with the National Intelligence Service, and he resigned from the job out of personal will in May 2018. He makes videos for the website Daily NK.

Thae testified before the US House Foreign Relations Committee in November 2017. Thae advised the use of soft power, such as disseminating outside information, to weaken Kim Jong-un's rule. He stated that the North Korean regime wants nuclear weapons in order to intimidate the U.S. into withdrawing its military forces from South Korea, thus weakening South Korea. He also equated the North Korean regime to that of apartheid-era South Africa and Nazi Germany.

In May 2018, Thae published Cryptography From the Third-Floor Secretariat, a memoir of his life as a North Korean diplomat. The book became a bestseller in South Korea. 10,000 copies of the first print run were sold in four days. It is a rare example of a book written by a North Korean defector becoming a bestseller in South Korea. The memoir was described  by Andrei Lankov as "a remarkably balanced and unbiased text" and it "writes about the North Korean system in a slightly detached way, describing how things are done but never going into a righteous frenzy of moralistic outrage".

In February 2020, Thae ran for a seat representing the Gangnam District of Seoul in the National Assembly in South Korea's parliamentary elections in April 2020. During his campaign, Thae ran under the pseudonym Tae Ku-min (태구민), Ku-min meaning "saving the people [of North Korea]". Despite initially facing skepticism regarding his campaign and having no connection to the Gangnam District, Thae easily beat his opponent, becoming the first North Korean defector to win a National Assembly seat through a constituency vote.

In May 2020, Thae apologised for claiming Kim Jong-un was probably so ill he could not stand during a three week period when Kim was not seen in public. The Democratic Party criticised Thae for carelessness, with some members urging that Thae should be excluded from the intelligence and defence committees.

Works

See also 

 Embassy of North Korea, London
 List of North Korean defectors in South Korea
 North Koreans in South Korea
 South Korean defectors
 Hwang Jang-yop, highest-ranking North Korean defector

References

External links

1962 births
Living people
Members of the National Assembly (South Korea)
North Korean expatriates in Denmark
North Korean expatriates in the United Kingdom
North Korean defectors
North Korean diplomats
Former Marxists
People from Pyongyang